Aleksandr Vasilyevich Kochetov (8 March 1919 — 31 January 1994) was a Soviet fighter pilot during World War II. Awarded the title Hero of the Soviet Union on 13 April 1944 for his initial victories, he went on to achieve a final tally of 20 solo and 11 shared shootdowns by the end of the war.

Adelina Sotnikova, 2014 Olympic champion in figure skating, is the Great granddaughter of Aleksandr Kochetov.

References 

1919 births
1994 deaths
Soviet World War II flying aces
Heroes of the Soviet Union
Recipients of the Order of Lenin
Recipients of the Order of the Red Banner